2013 Desafio Internacional das Estrelas was the eighth edition of Desafio Internacional das Estrelas (International Challenge of the Stars), the races scheduled for 12–13 January 2013 at Kartódromo do Beto Carrero World at Penha, Santa Catarina, Brazil. The event was won by  Jules Bianchi after he won the race 1 and finished in fourth position in race 2.

Participants 
Three champions took part in the 2013 edition (Massa, di Grassi and Alguersuari). 13 former and current Formula One drivers participated.

Classification

Qualifying

Race 1

Race 2

Final classification

References

External links
  

Desafio Internacional das Estrelas
Desafio Internacional das Estrelas